Ernest Dishman Peixotto (born July 24, 1929) is a retired United States Army lieutenant general who served as Comptroller of the United States Army from 1981 to 1984. He is a graduate of the United States Military Academy (1951).

References

1929 births
Living people
United States Army generals
People from Fort Leavenworth, Kansas